"Miles Away" is a song by American singer Madonna from her eleventh studio album, Hard Candy. It was first released as a promotional single in Japan, during June 2008, as the theme for the Fuji Television Japanese drama, Change. The song was released by Warner Bros. Records, as the third and final single from the album on October 17, 2008. It was subsequently included on her compilation album, Celebration (2009) and its music video on the accompanying music video collection, Celebration: The Video Collection. Madonna co-wrote and co-produced the track with Justin Timberlake, Timbaland and Nate "Danja" Hills. "Miles Away" is a melancholy electronic ballad, and is inspired by her then husband Guy Ritchie. The lyrics are autobiographical in nature and deals with long-distance relationships.

"Miles Away" has received positive appreciation from music critics who praised it as a harmonious and meaningful ballad. It reached the top forty in most countries, while peaking inside the top ten in Czech Republic, Netherlands, Hungary, Japan, Romania, Slovakia and Spain. It became the best-selling digital single of 2008 in Japan and won three trophies at the 23rd Japan Gold Disc Awards. In the United States, the song did not appear on the Billboard Hot 100, but became Madonna's seventh consecutive number-one song on the Hot Dance Airplay chart, the most for any artist. The song has been performed by Madonna in the promotional tour for the Hard Candy album and the 2008–09 Sticky & Sweet Tour, during the gypsy segment of the show.

Writing and inspiration

Madonna wrote and produced "Miles Away" with Justin Timberlake, Timbaland and Nate "Danja" Hills. It was the first song composed for Hard Candy. After hearing the music, Madonna began singing and spontaneously coming up with the lyrics for the song. In an interview with MTV, Madonna said that the song was inspired by her then husband, Guy Ritchie. "So many people have to deal with long-distance relationships. It's not easy. You have to work hard to make it work." When asked if the song was autobiographical, she said:
Probably in many respects most of the songs [on Hard Candy] are [autobiographical]. But in more of an unconscious way. I don't really think about telling personal stories when I'm writing music. It just comes. And then a lot of times, six months later, eight months later, I go, "Oh, that's what I wrote that song about." But that's when I play the song for lots of people and they all go, 'Oh, I can totally relate to that'. In 'Miles Away' I'm tapping into the global consciousness of people who have intimacy problems.
In an interview with The Daily Telegraph Madonna further explained her inspiration behind the song and stated that "['Miles Away' is] a song most people who work can relate to. If part of your work is travelling, and the person you are with also works and travels, you find yourself separated a lot and it can be very frustrating, [...] I'm American and he [Ritchie] is British, and I have to come to America all the time. [...] Especially at the beginning of our relationship, that long-distance thing was very frustrating. I also think it's easier for people to say things from a distance; it's safer."

Recording and composition

During recording, Timberlake sat down with Madonna and played a guitar riff composed by him, asking her how she wanted the song to sound. Madonna had "all these thoughts, riddles, poems, feelings, all written in huge notebooks," Timberlake said, "and she kept handing them over. It was amazing, taking these little bits here and there and putting them together like a puzzle." In this way, one of the ideas they connected was the universality of long-distance relationships, the pain and heartache of which they were able to incorporate in "Miles Away". After recording it, Timberlake commented that he had helped in creating a classic Madonna song, saying "I couldn't do a song like that, [...] I thought it was completely her. That was the trick."

Musically, "Miles Away" is a melancholy song composed like a ballad. The track carries the characteristic sound of Timbaland-Timberlake production. Generally a downtempo, electropop song, "Miles Away" is accompanied by beats and backing vocals, which sing the lines "So far away". According to the sheet music published at Musicnotes.com by Alfred Publishing, the song is set in the time signature of common time, with a moderate tempo of 116 beats per minute. It is written in the key of A minor; Madonna's voice spans from the low-note of G3 to the high-note of C5. "Miles Away" has a basic sequence of Am–Em–G–F–Am–Em–G–F as its chord progression.

Lyrically, "Miles Away" deals with a relationship in trouble. Madonna said that it's not difficult to express herself lyrically without giving away too much of her own privacy. Though Madonna has said before that the song is about Guy Ritchie, it has been speculated that lines from the lyrics of the song like: "You always have the biggest heart when we're 6,000 miles apart", talked about the then failing marriage between Madonna and Guy.

Critical reception
Kerri Mason of Billboard called the song a harmonious ballad which, along with the single "4 Minutes", "might be some of her best work yet". She also said that the song sounded familiar and compared it with Timbaland's remix of the 2008 single "Apologize". Caryn Ganz from Rolling Stone believed the song has a "melancholy pining". Stephen Thomas Erlewine from Allmusic held the view that "the icy heartbreak of 'Miles Away'" was "a worthy successor of Justin Timberlake's 2006 single 'What Goes Around.../...Comes Around'". Sal Cinquemani of Slant Magazine said that the song has the typical ensuring quality of the production of Timbaland and Justin Timberlake, and bears the "pair's distinct, modern stamp, making Hard Candy more than just a throwback to Donna Summer, Anita Ward, and Quaaludes." Chris William from Entertainment Weekly made the observation that "Miles Away" was one of the "few actual confessions on this dance floor [Hard Candy]—enough to give the tabs speculative fodder." He also compared the song to "What Goes Around.../...Comes Around". Jim Farber of the New York Daily News called it the album's most beguiling tune.

Joan Anderman of The Boston Globe said that Madonna's journey "from shameless seductress to thoughtful student produces nary a ballad, but some seriously bittersweet tones linger under the surface of these effusive tunes." He also said that the song has a peace of mind quality in it. Joey Guerra from Houston Chronicle complemented the galloping beats and melodic backing vocals of "Miles Away" and said that it "sounds like late-'80s Madonna". Alexis Petridis from The Guardian said Madonna sings "with the emotional engagement of a sat-nav suggesting a right turn onto the A23." Miles Marshall Lewis of The Village Voice said that with "Miles Away", Madonna comes closest "to reflecting on her married-with-children bliss (or lack thereof)." Tom Young from the BBC called the song "genuinely good, genuinely felt" and compared it with some of Madonna's other hit songs like "Holiday", "Into the Groove", "Ray of Light" and "Music". Pete Paphides of The Times called the song "excellent", and describing it as "a collision of acoustic downstrokes and feverishly jaunty rhythm that verges on reggae." Thomas Hauner of PopMatters said, "At one point the album’s tediousness [...] is such that one assumes Ashlee Simpson and Britney have already passed on the material because even they deemed it too redundant."

Chart performance
In the United States "Miles Away" charted on the Billboard Hot Dance Club Play chart and peaked at number two. The song became Madonna's ninth release to top the Hot Singles Sales chart, moving from number 31 to the top, and becoming the first number-one song of the chart for 2009. It debuted at number fifteen on the Hot Dance Airplay chart and reached number one in its December 27, 2008 issue. This feat gave Madonna her seventh consecutive number one single on the Hot Dance Airplay chart making her the artist with the most Dance Airplay hits on this chart. On the issue dated December 20, 2008, "Miles Away" debuted and peaked at number 99 on the Pop 100 chart but dropped off it the following week. The song debuted at number 90 on the Canadian Hot 100. The next week it dropped out of the chart, but made a re-entry and climbed up to the top forty, peaking at number 23 for the issue dated December 13, 2008.

"Miles Away" achieved the best commercial reception in Japan, where it was used as the theme for Fuji Television drama Change. It was first released there as a promotional single in 2008, following "4 Minutes". The song peaked at number seven on the Japan Hot 100 on May 30, 2008, and stayed on the chart for 10 weeks. It became the best-selling digital single of 2008 and received music certifications from the Recording Industry Association of Japan (RIAJ)—platinum for 250,000 PC downloads, and double platinum for 500,000 master ringtones. At the 23rd annual Japan Gold Disc Awards, "Miles Away" won three awards as "Mastertone of the Year", "Mobile Single Track of the Year" and "Online Single Track of the Year". According to the RIAJ, the song has sold 681,000 digital downloads as of April 2009.

On November 30, 2008, the song entered the UK Singles Chart at number 39, selling 5,643 digital downloads. It dropped to number 68 the following week and then dropped off the chart. This ended a run of 63 consecutive top 20 UK hits for Madonna, stretching from 1984 through 2008, as "Miles Away" became Madonna's first ever single (apart from debut single "Everybody") not to crack the UK top twenty. The track debuted at number 39 in the Dutch Top 40 on September 20, 2008, and reached a peak of number ten on November 15, 2008. In Australia, the Thin White Duke Mix charted at number 28 on the Australian Club Charts. In Spain, "Miles Away" became her third consecutive single from Hard Candy to reach number one on the official singles chart. In other countries, "Miles Away" peaked within the top forty of the official charts.

Live performance

Madonna performed "Miles Away" during the promotional tour for Hard Candy and the 2008–09 Sticky & Sweet Tour. In the promotional tour, Madonna performed "Miles Away" as the second song from the six-song set list. Madonna wore a black dress with black tails, track pants and high-heeled, lace-up boots. She performed the song standing in front of the microphone while playing acoustic guitar. The backdrops showed graphical images of airplanes leaving London and arriving in New York, boarding passes and passports as well as airports.

In the Sticky & Sweet Tour, "Miles Away" was performed during the gypsy segment of the show. Madonna wore a gypsy inspired Givenchy long cape, over a black dress, with pink colored ribbons around her neck. She also wore black stockings on her leg. Before starting the song she said, "This is for all who know the struggle of long-distance relationships. I know you're out there." While dancers gathered and sat down in a circle around her, Madonna went up on a platform, started playing the acoustic guitar and encouraged the crowd to clap and sing along. The screens give another message to the song, showing a stream of world maps and passport stamps and the history as well as journey of gypsies travelling around the world, adding to the atmosphere of that particular section of the show. The live performance of the song at River Plate Stadium of Buenos Aires, Argentina, was recorded and released on the live album, Sticky & Sweet Tour (2010).

After the breakup between Madonna and Guy Ritchie was announced, during a performance of "Miles Away" on the tour's Boston stop, she dedicated the song to the "emotionally retarded". She then added, "You may know a few people who fall into that category—God knows I do," the line being a probable reference to Ritchie himself although this has not been confirmed.

Track listing and formats

EU / UK 2 Track CD Single
 "Miles Away" (Album Version) – 4:48
 "Miles Away" (Thin White Duke Remix) – 6:10EU Maxi CD Single / Digital Maxi Single / UK 12" Picture Disc
 "Miles Away" (Album Version) – 4:48
 "Miles Away" (Thin White Duke Remix) – 6:10
 "Miles Away" (Rebirth Remix) – 7:27
 "Miles Away" (Johnny Vicious Club Mix) – 7:23

EU/US Maxi CD Single
 "Miles Away" (Radio Edit) – 3:45
 "Miles Away" (Thin White Duke Remix) – 6:09
 "Miles Away" (Morgan Page Remix) – 7:07
 "Miles Away" (Johnny Vicious Club Remix) – 7:23
 "Miles Away" (Johnny Vicious Warehouse Mix) – 8:18
 "Miles Away" (Rebirth Remix) – 7:27
 "Miles Away" (Aaron LaCrate & Samir B-More Gutter Remix) – 4:57US Digital Maxi Remixes "Miles Away" (Thin White Duke Remix) – 6:09
 "Miles Away" (Johnny Vicious Club Mix) – 7:22
 "Miles Away" (Johnny Vicious Warehouse Mix) – 8:18
 "Miles Away" (Morgan Page Remix) – 7:07
 "Miles Away" (Morgan Page Dub) – 7:10
 "Miles Away" (Rebirth Remix) – 7:24
 "Miles Away" (Aaron LaCrate & Samir B-More Gutter Mix) – 4:57US Digital Maxi Remix Edits "Miles Away" (Radio Edit) – 3:43
 "Miles Away" (Thin White Duke Edit) – 4:33
 "Miles Away" (Morgan Page Edit) – 3:50
 "Miles Away" (Johnny Vicious Club Mix Edit) – 4:37
 "Miles Away" (Rebirth Edit) – 4:00
 "Miles Away" (Aaron LaCrate & Samir B-More Gutter Edit) – 3:28US 2× 12" Vinyl Set
 A1. "Miles Away" (Thin White Duke Remix) – 6:09
 A2. "Miles Away" (Radio Edit) – 3:43
 B1. "Miles Away" (Johnny Vicious Club Remix) – 7:26
 B2. "Miles Away" (Morgan Page Dub) – 7:08
 C1. "Miles Away" (Johnny Vicious Warehouse Mix) - 8:20
 C2. "Miles Away" (Aaron LaCrate & Samir B-More Gutter Remix) - 5:00
 D1. "Miles Away" (Morgan Page Remix) - 7:07
 D2. "Miles Away" (Rebirth Remix) - 7:30

Credits and personnel
Credits adapted from Hard Candy liner notes.

Management

 Recorded at Sarm West Studios in London and The Hit Factory in Miami.
 Mastered at Sterling Sound Studios in New York City.
 Programmed and Mixed at Storm-Circle Entertainment.
 Timbaland appears courtesy of Blackground Records
 Justin Timberlake appears courtesy of Jive Records
 Webo Girl Publishing, Inc. (ASCAP), All Rights o/b/o Webo Girl Publishing, Inc. Admin. By WBmusic Corp. (ASCAP)
 Warner Bros. Music Corp. (ASCAP) and Virginia Beach Music (ASCAP), Admin. By WBmusic Corp. (ASCAP)
 Tennman Tunes, Admin. Byuniversal Music – Z Tunes LLC (ASCAP), o/b/o Justin Timberlake
 W.B.M. Music Corp. (Sesac)& Danjahandz Muzik (Sesac), Admin. By W.B.M.Music Corp. (ASCAP)

Personnel

 Madonna – songwriter, vocals, producer
 Timbaland – songwriter, producer
 Justin Timberlake – songwriter, producer, background vocals, guitar
 Danja – producer, writer
 Demacio "Demo" Castellon – recording, programming, audio mixing
 Marcella "Ms. Lago" Araica – recording
 Chris Gehringer – audio mastering
 Ron Taylor – Pro Tools editing
 Dan Warner – guitar
 Hannon Lane – additional keyboards
 Julian Vasquez – assistant engineering
 Vadim Chislov – assistant engineering
 Graham Archer – assistant engineering
 Fareed Salamah – assistant engineering
 Jose Castellon – recording and mixing assistant
 Joseph Castellon – recording and mixing assistant

Charts

Weekly charts

Year-end charts

Certifications

See also
List of number-one singles of 2008 (Spain)
List of number-one dance airplay hits of 2008 (U.S.)
List of best-selling singles in Japan

References

2000s ballads
2008 singles
2008 songs
Madonna songs
Electropop ballads
Number-one singles in Spain
Song recordings produced by Madonna
Song recordings produced by Justin Timberlake
Song recordings produced by Danja (record producer)
Song recordings produced by Timbaland
Songs written by Danja (record producer)
Songs written by Madonna
Songs written by Timbaland
Songs written by Justin Timberlake
Japanese television drama theme songs
Warner Records singles
Songs about loneliness